The red-billed leiothrix (Leiothrix lutea) is a member of the family Leiothrichidae, native to southern China and the Himalayas. Adults have bright red bills and a dull yellow ring around their eyes. Their backs are dull olive green, and they have a bright yellow-orange throat with a yellow chin; females are somewhat duller than males, and juveniles have black bills.  It has also been introduced in various parts of the world, with small populations of escapees having existed in Japan since the 1980s. It has become a common cagebird and amongst aviculturists it goes by various names: Pekin robin, Pekin nightingale, Japanese nightingale, and Japanese (hill) robin, the last two being misnomers as it is not native to Japan (although it has been introduced and naturalised there).

Taxonomy
The red-billed leiothrix was formally described in 1786 by the Austrian naturalist Giovanni Antonio Scopoli under the binomial name Sylvia lutea. The species is now placed together with the silver-eared mesia in the genus Leiothrix that was introduced in 1832 by the English naturalist William John Swainson. The genus name combines the Ancient Greek leios meaning "smooth" and thrix meaning "hair". The specific epithet lutea is from Latin luteus meaning "saffron-yellow". Scopoli specified the type location as China but this was subsequently restricted to the mountainous regions of the Chinese province of Anhui.

Five subspecies are recognised:
 L. l. kumaiensis Whistler, 1943 – northwest Himalayas
 L. l. calipyga (Hodgson, 1837) – central Himalayas to northwest Myanmar
 L. l. yunnanensis Rothschild, 1921 – northeast Myanmar and south China
 L. l. kwangtungensis Stresemann, 1923 – southeast China and north Vietnam
 L. l. lutea (Scopoli, 1786) – south-central, east China

Description 
The leiothrix is about six inches in length, generally olive green, and has a yellow throat with orange shading on the breast. It also has a dull yellowish ring around the eye that extends to the beak. The edges of the wing feathers are brightly coloured with yellow, orange, red and black and the forked tail is olive brown and blackish at the tip. The cheeks and side of the neck are a bluish grey colour. The female is a lot paler than the male and lacks the red patch on the wings. It doesn't fly frequently, except in open habitats. This bird is very active and an excellent singer but very secretive and difficult to see.

Distribution and habitat 
The leiothrix is usually found in India, Bhutan, Nepal, Burma and parts of Tibet. This species is a bird of the hill forests, found in every type of jungle though it prefers pine forests with bushes. It has also been found at elevations ranging from near sea level to about 7,500 feet. In Japan it prefers forests of Abies and Tsuga with a dense understorey of bamboo.

The species was introduced to the Hawaiian Islands in 1918 and spread to all the forested islands except Lanai. Its population on Oahu crashed in the 1960s and it disappeared from Kauai, but is now common and increasing on Oahu.  The leiothrix was released in Western Australia but it failed to become established. This species was also introduced in Great Britain but permanent establishment was thought to be unsuccessful, although a cluster of sightings in 2020–2022 in southern England suggests that some colonies may have been established. It was introduced to France, where it is now established in several areas, and Spain where it is increasing and spreading from the Collserola Park. In Japan, naturalised populations of what is probably the nominate subspecies of this species have been recorded since the 1980s and it has become established in central and southwestern Japan. It is also established on the Mascarene island of Réunion. The species has also been introduced in Italy where three major populations can be identified (Tuscany and Liguria, Latium, Colli Euganei) and there are several areas at high risk of invasion.

Behaviour and ecology
The presence of the avian malaria parasite has been found in the blood of this species.

Diet
This bird feeds on animal matter. It eats fruits such as strawberries, ripened papaya, guavas and also various species of Diptera, Mollusca, Lepidoptera, and Hymenoptera. Its food is usually gathered from foliage and dead wood and it usually searches for food in lower strata of vegetation.

Breeding
The leiothrix can usually be found in a group of about ten to thirty birds during the non-breeding season; however, during the breeding season the birds break off into pairs and become territorial. These birds have a song which consists of short powerful notes that are repeated continuously throughout the year but it is more persistent during the breeding season. This period usually lasts from early April until September and they are usually found around well watered areas. The males sing long complex songs with a wide array of syllables to attempt to attract the female.

The leiothrix is an open cup nester. The nests of the red-billed leiothrix are composed of dry leaves, moss and lichen; however, they are not well hidden because concealment isn't really a primary factor when determining a nest site. Several nests are found between April and June and are placed within ten feet of the ground. Dense vegetation provides the shrub nesting species protection against predators.

The eggs of the leiothrix are found in clutches of two to four eggs with an average of three. They are broad and blunt in shape with some gloss on the outside and they also have a pale blue colour and red like brown spots that encircle the larger end of the eggs. The newly hatched birds have bright red skin and a rich orange red gape.

Gallery

References

External links 

red-billed leiothrix
Birds of South China
red-billed leiothrix